The Federal Revenue Sharing Act, also called the Expenditures from Receipts Act, was a bill passed in 1913 by the US Congress. It allowed the federal government to split national forest and park revenues 50–50 between itself and the states for National Forest Road and Trail repair.

1913 in law
62nd United States Congress
United States federal public land legislation
United States federal legislation articles without infoboxes